The Virginia Slim of Oklahoma City is a defunct WTA Tour affiliated women's tennis tournament played from 1971 to 1972. It was held in Oklahoma City, Oklahoma in the United States and played on indoor Carpet courts.

Results

Singles

Doubles

References
 WTA Results Archive

External links

 
Hard court tennis tournaments
Indoor tennis tournaments
Defunct tennis tournaments in the United States
Virginia Slims tennis tournaments
1971 establishments in Oklahoma
1972 disestablishments in Oklahoma